The Billboard Year-End chart is a chart published by Billboard which denotes the top song of each year as determined by the publication's charts. Since 1946, Year-End charts have existed for the top songs in pop, R&B, and country, with additional album charts for each genre debuting in 1956, 1966, and 1965, respectively.

See also 
Best-selling albums by year in the United States

References

Lists of number-one albums in the United States
Lists of number-one songs in the United States